Gregory Keith Hough (1958 – 10 April 2008) was an association football player who represented New Zealand at international level.

Hough made a solitary official international appearance for New Zealand in a 3–0 win over New Caledonia on 5 March 1977, scoring one of New Zealand's goals, Clive Campbell scoring the other two.

References 

1958 births
2008 deaths
Manurewa AFC players
New Zealand association footballers
New Zealand international footballers
Association footballers not categorized by position